Germany competed at the 2019 World Athletics Championships in Doha, Qatar, from 27 September to 6 October 2019.

Medalists

Entrants
 including alternates

Men
Track and road events

Field events

Combined events – Decathlon

Women
Track and road events

Field events

Mixed
Track and road events

References

Nations at the 2019 World Athletics Championships
World Championships in Athletics
2019